Aravind KP is an Indian professional motor racer. In 2005, he made his debut in National motocross races and within a year, TVS Racing spotted him at Gulf Dirt Track National Championship in 2006 and sponsored him. Since then, he has won more than 17 events in different motorsports disciplines like Dirt track, two-wheeler rallies and motocross and supercross events, and also had one international trophy. Aravind biggest victory on Indian soil came in 2015 when he tasted victory at the Raid De Himalaya, considered as the toughest terrain at high altitude. He participated in Dakar Rally thrice. In the 2019 Dakar Rally he finished 37th position becoming the only Indian to finish the rally that year and 2nd Indian overall to finish the rally over the years. He received best sportsperson of the year award in the year 2019 by the Federation of Motor Sports Clubs in India (FMSCI), the governing body for motorsports in India and the ASN of FIA and FIM. He has appeared in Dulquer Salmaan's Bangalore Days movie. He was Runner-up in Bigg Boss Kannada Season 8 (BBK 8) Television Reality Show. Aravind K.P recently was a part of a National record: Mahindra XUV700 24 hours endurance challenge.

Early life 
Aravind K.P grew up in Udupi which is known for its iconic race 'Kambla'. Right from childhood, Aravind KP loved to watch races and was inspired from them. When he was 16 years old, a supercross event happened in Manipal. He was watching it and secretly thought of racing as his career. For this, he wanted a bike and when he asked about this to his father, his father had put forth a condition stating that "if he scores above 80% in his 12th board exams, he would be given a bike" and it so happened that Aravind K.P scored 84.7% in his 12th board exams and had got a bike. At the age of 19, Aravind started racing and a local mechanical suggested to take his riding on the race track. He started racing in local events as a privateer without informing his parents. As a college student, when there was scarcity of money, his friends would sponsor his tyres, clutch cable and other parts and they made sure that there was enough fuel in his bike and also brought food for Aravind when he ran out of money. His father woke up one day and saw his photo in the newspaper, Aravind had won the 'Raymond's classic' race in Mangalore. Initially his parents did not like him racing but after a few days they were convinced and they got to know that was passionate towards racing and that was his interest. Besides this, Aravind K.P is also a National level swimmer, state level skater and many other track and fields activities.

Career 
2005- Made his debut in National motocross

2006- Won at the Gulf Dirt Track National Championship held in Manglore, Karnataka.

2007- Won at the Gulf Dirt Track National Championship at Kolhapur, Maharashtra.

2009- MRF Mogrip National Super Cross Championship

2010- Won at the Gulf Dirt Track National Championship at Bhopal, Madhya Pradesh, finished 2nd at Vijayabahu Motor cross held at Sri Lanka

2011- First place at the Gajaba Super Cross 2011. Aravind KP showed his excellent riding skills by winning two races in the motorcycle racing even and won the racing up to 250 (four stroke) motor one and motor two events at Cartlon Super Sports Festival 2011, Received Autotrack Motorsports Award in 2011 for winning the super cross Championship in Sri Lanka.

2012- Gulf National Championship Super Cross 2012.

2013- National Champion in Group A foreign bike class and Group B Indian expert class, Winner at the Cavalry Super cross 2013 held in Sri Lanka.

2014- Won Gulf Super Cross 2014 at Nasik, National Super Cross Championship, Fox Hill Super Cross, Sigiri Rally Cross, finished 2nd at Vijayabahu Motor cross held at Sri Lanka.

2015- Won 250cc to 500cc Group A, Foreign expert MRF Mogrip National Super Cross Championship for bikes, Fox Hill Super Cross, Champion Rider Maruti Suzuki Raid De Himalaya, Maruti Suzuki Dakshin Dare Champion, National Champion at Indian National Rally Championship, MRF Mogrip National Super Cross Championship, Won at the V12 Super cross, open class Moto 1 and 2.

2016- Participated at the Oilibya Rally, Morocco, North Africa in 2016 and finished at the 26th position overall, MRF Mogrip National Super Cross Championship.

2017- He finished in 12th place in Pan Africa 2017 in Morocco, Aravind KP has created history by finishing at top 15 in last round of FIM cross country world rally championship 2017.

2018- Received Autotrack Motorsports Award in 2018.

2019- He aced the World's toughest Dakar rally at 37th position, Sports star Aces Awards Sportsperson of the year(Motorsports).

Aravind KP has also received the NDTV motorsports award for his tremendous achievements. He is one of the most accomplished bike racer in the history of Indian 2 wheeler dirt bike racing. Also he is the second Indian to win all the major National titles in one season.

Cinema and television 
He made his debut in the Kannada movie Naanu Mattu Varalakshmi. He made his debut in the Malayalam movie Bangalore Days.

Aravind will be seen in the lead role along with his Bigg Boss co-star Divya Uruduga in director Aravind Kaushik 's movie Ardhambardha Prema Kathe slated to be released in 2023.

Aravind KP is the first runner up  in the Bigg Boss Kannada (season 8). Through BiggBoss he has achieved a huge fanbase in Karnataka and has inspired lakhs of people through his achievements and behaviour. He also performed the stunts on a motorcycle for MS Dhoni as a body-double in an advertisement.

Awards 
 Sportsman Of the Year - 2019 
Received the NDTV motorsports award for his tremendous achievements
 1st Runner up of Bigg Boss Kannada (season 8).

References

External links 

 
 

1985 births
Living people